The 1947 Five Nations Championship was the eighteenth series of the rugby union Five Nations Championship. Including the previous incarnations as the Home Nations and Five Nations, this was the fifty-third series of the northern hemisphere rugby union championship. Ten matches were played between 1 January and 19 April. It was contested by England, France, Ireland, Scotland and Wales.

The competition was not only the first after World War II, but also marked the return of France after an absence of 16 years. Les Bleus had been expelled from the tournament after the 1931 event over allegations of professionalism and administrative deficiencies; they were readmitted after the 1939 tournament, but shortly thereafter war forced the suspension of international rugby. The return of France established the Five Nations lineup until 2000, when the admission of Italy created the modern Six Nations.

Participants
The teams involved were:

Table

Results

External links

Six Nations Championship seasons
Five Nations
Five Nations
Five Nations
Five Nations
Five Nations 
Five Nations 
Five Nations
Five Nations
Five Nations
Five Nations